Marion-Franklin High School (MFHS, Marion) is a four-year high school (grades 9-12) located on the south side of Columbus, Ohio, at 1265 Koebel Road.  Marion-Franklin is one of 17 traditional high schools in the Columbus City Schools district. The school colors are red and white, with black as an unofficial color.  The school mascot is the Red Devil.

Administration 
There are three administrators at Marion-Franklin High School: a head principal, and two assistant principals.

Sports

Fall

American football
Soccer
Girls' volleyball
Cross country
Girls' tennis
Golf
Cheerleading
Drill team (Marionettes)
Marching band
Mock trial
Majorettes (baton twirlers)

Winter

Basketball
Wrestling
Girls' basketball
Cheerleading

Spring

Baseball
Softball
Track and field

Scandal
Several district employees were caught altering attendance records for struggling students in order to improve performance ratings. Because of this, former principal Pamela K. Diggs was fired in early 2014.

Notable alumni
 Ken Lanier, former NFL player (Denver Broncos)
 Eddie Milner, former MLB player (Cincinnati Reds, San Francisco Giants)
 Mike Tatum, former Marion basketball and football player; former four-time IFL champion, Sioux Falls (2013–16)
 Herb Williams, former NBA player (Indiana Pacers, Dallas Mavericks, New York Knicks, Toronto Raptors)
John Williamson (born 1986), basketball player for Hapoel Tel Aviv B.C. of the Israeli Basketball Premier League

References

External links
 Wrestling team website

High schools in Columbus, Ohio
Educational institutions established in 1953
Public high schools in Ohio
1953 establishments in Ohio